is a town located in Tokachi Subprefecture, Hokkaido, Japan. The name "Shikaoi" means "Following (hunting) deer".

As of September 2016, the town has an estimated population of 5,570 and a density of 14 persons per km2. The total area is 399.69 km2. There are several towns around Shikaoi including Shimizu, Shintoku, and Shihoro

History
Shikaoi's beginning can be traced back to 1902, when Mr. Yamada of Tokyo settled into what is now the main street of Shikaoi. By 1913, a train station opened up the flow of settlers from Honshu. Not long after this, a post office, a police station and several small restaurants opened.

In 1920, the population of Shikaoi was 4,526 people (822 families). In April 1921, it became the Shikaoi village. Kasai Railway was laid in 1923 to aid the transporting of beets from the region. Also, general cargo and passenger transport were permitted in May 1925. A big role was played for industrial development of Shikaoi by the upgrading a network of roads and railway.

The population increased rapidly by the settlement of Japan Self-Defense Forces Stationing Grounds after the World War. (Population of 10,448 people, 1,970 families in the 1960 census). The Shikaoi region and Shikaoi Town came together in 1959.

After a peak population of 10,778 people in 1961, it decreased gradually by the influence of cold-weather damage to agriculture. But after 1993, it became stable with many efforts, including improved agriculture.

In 1984, Shikaoi began a sister town relationship with Stony Plain, Alberta, Canada. Since that time, ongoing exchange programs have kept the relationship strong. The exchange program has also provided Shikaoi the opportunity to advance by visiting ideas gathered during exchanges.

Climate

References

External links

Official Website 

Towns in Hokkaido